Oddbjørn Vatne (born 3 September 1948) is a Norwegian politician for the Centre Party.

He served as a deputy representative to the Norwegian Parliament from Møre og Romsdal during the terms 2001–2005 and 2005–2009. In total he met during 88 days of parliamentary session.

On the local level he has been mayor of Haram municipality.

References

1948 births
Living people
People from Haram, Norway
Deputy members of the Storting
Centre Party (Norway) politicians
Mayors of places in Møre og Romsdal